Elsecar railway station is a railway station serving the village of Elsecar in South Yorkshire, England. It is on the Penistone Line and Hallam Line served by Northern Trains. The station was opened by the Midland Railway in July 1897 and was at one time known as Elsecar & Hoyland.

CCTV was recently installed for the purposes of crime prevention. Other improvements to the station include new signage, lighting, and the installation of passenger information display screens to provide real-time service information.

A new 85-bay car park at the station was opened in November 2013 - funded by South Yorkshire PTE, this cost £500,000 and is located behind the northbound platform.

Facilities
Elsecar station is unstaffed and has no permanent buildings. Standard waiting shelters are provided on each side, along with a customer help point on platform 1. Train running information is offered via the display screens at the entrance to, and on the platforms and via timetable information posters. Step-free access is available to each platform via ramps, there are two ramps to the Northbound platform. There are bicycle storage facilities on both platforms.

Ticket machines were installed on each platform in 2018, however these are currently out of use as of May 2021 due to vandalism.

Service

See also
Elsecar Steam Railway
Earl Fitzwilliam's private railway station
Rockingham (South Yorkshire) railway station

Notes

External links

Railway stations in Barnsley
DfT Category F1 stations
Former Midland Railway stations
Railway stations in Great Britain opened in 1897
Northern franchise railway stations
Hoyland